Xuma is a surname. Notable people with the name include:

Alfred Bitini Xuma (1893–1962), first black South African to become a medical doctor and president-general of the African National Congress
Madie Hall Xuma (1894–1982),  American activist in South Africa

See also
Dr Xuma house, Historical building in South Africa